Waterkloof House Preparatory School (WHPS, pronounced, and commonly known as, WHiPS) is an independent (private) primary school in Pretoria, South Africa, offering education to grade 000 and grade 00 boys and girls, and grade 0–7 boys only through the medium of English. Well known former pupils include, amongst others, Deon Chang, journalist; Eddie Barlow, South African international cricket star; Richard Sterne, professional golfer; Tony Peake, novelist; and Elon Musk, business magnate, founder of SpaceX and CEO of Tesla Motors.

History

1923 
Waterkloof House Preparatory School has grown substantially from its small beginnings in 1923 with a total of twelve pupils to a prestigious preparatory school for boys, currently opening its doors to more than 400 pupils every year.

The original Brooklyn House Preparatory School was located on the south-east corner of MacKenzie and Alexander Streets in Brooklyn without electricity or modern conveniences.

1925 
To cope with the rapidly expanding numbers, the school moved to its present seven and a half acre site on Charles Street (Justice Mahomed Street), then known as Bailey's Avenue early in 1925.

1946 
The Ruddells ran this private boys school until 1946 and established the relaxed teacher-pupil relationship coupled with firm but fair discipline, which have become part of the school's tradition. The school was bought by Wilfred MacRobert when the Ruddells retired in 1946. WHiPS, as the school eventually became known, was virtually a family institution for the 18 years that MacRobert was associated with it.

Past headmasters

The Ruddell Brothers 1923–1947 
Frederick J Ruddell ('Mister') and Captain Ernest Ruddell ('Cappy'), twin sons of General and Mrs Ruddell (a one time Colonel of the Royal Scots), founders and headmasters of Waterkloof House Preparatory School, initially known as Brooklyn House Preparatory School, or more familiarly, 'Ruddells'.

At a time when South Africa was still recovering from World War I and the devastating strike on the rand in 1922, when Jan Smuts was Prime Minister, the Ruddell brothers opened their Preparatory School for boys on Friday, 2 February 1923, with a total complement of twelve day boys (£6-2-0d per term) and two boarders (£25 per term.)

Meffis "Ma" Lloyd 1927–1950 
Writing for the 1942 school magazine, Captain Ruddell recorded:

"There are very few boys who passed through Ruddells in the 'thirties' and 'forties' who will not recall with great affection Miss Meggis Lloyd, a member of staff since 1927. Before closing these notes I wish to record a special word of appreciation to Miss Lloyd for her unfounding help and co-operation in all that concerned the welfare of the school. During these difficult times, caused by changes of staff as, one by one our teachers have joined the Forces, Miss Lloyd has been ever ready to step into the breach and to give whole-hearted help wherever possible".

Dudley Gower, 1947–1949 
Joining the school of a little under 100 boys in 1943, Dudley Gower immediately established himself as a play writer and producer of note, producing four plays in his first year. He introduced many changes including the introduction of SG 1 and 2, more efficient timetabling, fortnightly report cards and daily report forms.

He succeeded to headmastership in 1947 on the express wish of Wilf MacRobert who was to succeed him three years later.

It was during Dudley's first year as a headmaster that WHPS experienced its first 'strike'. The shock to the boys (parent's) of Smuts and his United Party's unexpected loss of the first post-war election was too much for the boys to tolerate.

At the end of 1949, Dudley Gower resigned and returned to England. "His going will be a great loss to the school and to me personally", acknowledged Wilf.

Wilfred MacRobert, 1950–1968 

"Those of us who have been closely associated with him during the past few years, know well the outstanding ability and hours of hard work which he gave so selflessly to the welfare of the school. Many of his ideas and innovations in the general routine of the school will be of permanent value to us. We will miss him most though for the man he is, a man of character and ideals with the courage of his convictions, a fine sense of humour and one who invariably put himself last".

With the retirement of the Ruddells at the end of 1946, they offered the headmastership to Wilfred MacRobert, an old boy, who at the age of 27 years felt that he was too young and inexperienced to become a headmaster having only joined the school in 1946.

"Mr Dudley Gower (who had joined the school in 1943) agreed to act as headmaster until I was ready to take over. This was an altruistic act of Dudley’s for which I shall always be grateful".

WHPS had now grown to a staff of 9 teachers and 144 pupils, at which time grade 1 and grade 2 classes were established.

Michael M Quail, 1969–1973 
It fell to Michael Quail to uphold the record and traditions established by the previous headmasters. Michael was supported by his wife, Blanche, herself a university graduate and teacher of English, art, drama and a playwright.

It was during the Quail era that WHPS entered into a period of transition and consolidation. The Transvaal Education Department's Curricula and schemes of work were introduced and, following a referendum of parents, Standard 6 classes were abandoned.

Seven new classrooms were built during his headmastership, which included improved facilities for science, art exhibitions, and a museum under the organisation of Robbie Macmillan and his wife.

Woodwork classes were introduced and with a library expanded to 2,226 books, compulsory half hour weekly library periods were introduced for all classes. Enrolment of pupils in the Golden Jubilee Year of 1973 stood at 160 day boys and 40 boarders.

Midway through the school's 50th anniversary year, which was celebrated with a 'Grand Fete,’ Michael Quail resigned his position as headmaster.

Michael de Lisle, 1973–1980 
Michael de Lisle, a Rhodes Scholar, and his wife, Mary Beth, took over the school in July 1973, halfway through its Golden Jubilee Year, and saw it through a difficult time when numbers were declining. It was in this period that the move to spare land at St Alban's was promoted by the School Council but rejected by the Old Boys.

The school community, in which the Old Boys' Association was prominent, undertook a concerted effort to keep the school's independence. What eventually made it possible for the school to stay was the re-establishment of standards and the slight rise in numbers that was de Lisle's achievement.

Upon his retirement, Michael de Lisle began a new career as an Anglican priest.

Patrick Hamilton, 1981–1989 
It was during a period of indecision and uncertainty of the future of WHPS that Patrick Hamilton was invited to assume the headmastership of his old school where he was once headboy (1953).

Hamilton was involved with tending the grounds, re-writing the syllabus, insisting on academic excellence, sportsmanship, writing and acting in school plays and introducing many ideas, for example, Project Term, After School Care Centre, Ruddell Theatre, Ikageng and Art Alive, which the school continues to benefit from to the present day.

Adult literacy classes were soon to follow for the domestics, gardeners and workers from the local neighbourhood. He left the school in 1989.

Gavin Sinclair, 1990–1999 
Gavin Sinclair became the headmaster in 1990. Inspired by his Council-supported overseas study tours, which included the UK and United States, WHPS could now boast design and technology, computer and music centres to international standards. 30% of the school's pupils were now playing musical instruments. The formation of a school orchestra was initiated whilst the choir continued to grow in numbers.

Tim Jackson 2000–2002 
Tim Jackson, his wife Robyn, and sons, Christopher and Matthew, joined WHPS at the turn of the new millennium. Jackson initiated a weekly newsletter, featuring a tongue-in-cheek cartoon of himself at the time, which today still serves as a useful communication medium with the parents.

Jackson's approach to leadership was that of "conserve and innovate", i.e. maintaining WHPS' values and traditions while introducing new concepts such as the school's Education Forward Plan and a Practical Maths Centre for the boys.

Jackson also introduced the WHPS Code of Conduct and "A Pupil’s Rights and Responsibilities" to assist the boys in embracing a sound value system.

During his term of office, WHPS entered the new millennium with the inauguration of the Waterkloof House Theatre, a legacy funded by parents, Old Boys and friends of the School.

Jackson and his wife left WHPS to teach at a school in Botswana.

Doran Herringer 2003–2009 
A graduate of Port Elizabeth, Doran Herringer has spent the greater part of his professional career at WHPS as a teacher, cricket coach, deputy headmaster and headmaster (as from 2003), supported by his wife, Dee.

Herringer has driven and supported a number of projects at WHPS: the establishment of the pre-prep with the introduction of girls (up to grade 00) for the first time in the school's history; the conversion of a house in Nicholson street into the new grade 0 block; and the installation of a new pool for the Junior Primary.

The introduction of smartboards in every classroom at WHPS during 2005 was a milestone. An exciting event was the realisation of Herringer's dream to install state-of-the-art turf cricket nets at WHPS in 2005 and the first-ever overseas cricket tour, during which the WHPS First XI won eight out of ten games against the UK teams.

Herringer retired at the end of 2009 and with 36 years of service to the school.

Old Boys Association 
Unusually for a prep school, many ex-WHPSians choose to maintain their contact with their prep school and become members of the WHPS Old Boys' Association. They raise funds for the school, arrange social functions to further the fellowship of the school and participate in sports events such as the annual Old Boys Soccer and Cricket days.

Over the years the WHPS Old Boys have made contributions to the development of the school and the campus, including building the squash courts, financing the new cricket nets, etc. They actively support the bursary fund making monies available for deserving children who have been in the school for no less than two years and who are in need of financial assistance to attend the school. They have also contributed to the school by being ambassadors for the school.

At the annual grade 7 Leavers' Dinner, all the grade 7 boys are handed their Old Boys' tie and 5 years later when they matriculate from high school they are all invited back for a Prawn braai and their first beer in Wilf's.

References

Primary schools in South Africa
Private schools in Gauteng
Schools in Pretoria